Ian Sinclair (born March 2, 1984) is an American voice actor and voice director who works with Funimation and Sentai Filmworks. He provides voices for English versions of Japanese anime series and video games. Some of his major roles include Toraji Ishida in Bamboo Blade; Dallas Genoard in Baccano!; Douglas Rosenberg in El Cazador de la Bruja; Takeru Oyama in Maken-ki!; Brook in the Funimation dub of One Piece; Juzo Sakakura in the Danganronpa series; Whis in Dragon Ball Super, and the title characters in Toriko and Space Dandy. In addition he performs the voice in video games the likes of Battleborn, Zaveid in Tales of Zestiria, Baron Flynt in Borderlands, Professor Nakayama and Jimbo Hodunk in Borderlands 2, and Berkut in Fire Emblem Echoes: Shadows of Valentia. Ian was in the English Dub cast as Yasuda in Shin Godzilla.

Biography
Sinclair was born in Dallas, Texas, U.S.A. on March 2, 1984. He is half-Canadian. Sinclair has been voice acting since he was studying theatre in college. After that, he had been working as an actor in Dallas, and occasionally in Los Angeles. Sinclair has also directed Spice and Wolf II, Black Butler I & II, Initial D, and Shana movie.

Filmography

Anime

Films

Video games

References

External links
 
 
 

1984 births
Living people
American male stage actors
American male video game actors
American male voice actors
American voice directors
People from Dallas
Place of birth missing (living people)
21st-century American male actors